George Pepall (29 February 1876 – 8 January 1953) was an English cricketer. He played 14 matches of first-class cricket for Gloucestershire between 1896 and 1904. His best figures were 5 for 63 against Yorkshire in 1896.

References

External links
 

1876 births
1953 deaths
English cricketers
Gloucestershire cricketers
People from Stow-on-the-Wold
Sportspeople from Gloucestershire